W. Ron Allen is the current tribal chairman for the Jamestown S’Klallam Tribe. He was elected to this position on November 8, 1977, but has occupied many other positions of leadership, most notably as the Treasurer for the National Congress of American Indians (NCAI) and as a board member of the First Nations Development Institute. He is also well known for his involvement with both the US and tribal gaming industries. His longevity as a leader has allowed him to help his S'Klallam Tribe while also providing aid to many other tribes that are federally recognized in the US.

Early life 
Allen attended Peninsula Community College from 1978-1982 where he served as student body president. He later earned dual bachelor's degrees in Economics and Political Science from the University of Washington.

Political career 
Allen's involvement can be traced all the way back to 1975 where he was appointed as the chairman of the S'Klallam tribe. After losing his BIA card (a card that proved his Native ancestry), he was looking for an opportunity to replace it when a chairman from the S'Klallam tribe stepped down from his position. After his acceptance of this opportunity, he would go on to serve for over 40 years, being responsible for the financial wellbeing of over 200 tribes. Currently, Allen serves as a tribal representative for the Department of Interior, Health and Human Services, as well as the Department of Treasury Internal Revenue Service. He also is the president for the Washington Indian Gaming Association (WIGA).

Involvement with the NCAI 
Allen was largely involved with the NCAI, serving as treasurer from 1989 to 1993 and president from 1995 to 1999. The main purpose of the NCAI was to get Indians involved politically in American politics, as well as protecting Indians' rights to representation in the federal government. As treasure, he was responsible for reporting the amount of money that Native American tribes were spending for their political campaigns. In a NCAI hearing during 2006, Allen reveals a shocking discrepancy between the amount of funding Native American parties receive versus the funding available for American political campaigns. Allen points out that Native Americans are being underrepresented in their donations as tribal donations made up just 0.4% of the total donations across the US, while Natives represent 4% of the population. When averaged between personas, the average Native American contributed $2 to political campaign, while the averaged US citizen was contributing $10. Allen explains in an interview that this difference in spending can be partially due to the Natives not being interested in involving themselves with the federal government. Their perspective is one of self-focus, where all resources are spent on the tribe rather than the federal government. However, this lack of contribution creates an extreme difference in Native representation in federal politics, as they are not supporting political candidates in the federal government, diminishing their ability to engage in the formation of policies that affect them. Allen stepped in as the treasurer for the NCAI in 1989, using his previous experience as a treasurer from the Affiliated Tribes of Northwest Indians, and was able to increase their political spending budget by teaching tribes how to develop business strategies around gaming. He also taught tribes to begin providing expectations that were connected to their political contributions. Previously, all donations made by tribes had no strings attached, Allen taught the tribes to establish expectations regarding tribal policies or positions candidates were taking, allowing them to further the influence their contributions were having in the federal government. Allen's involvement with the NCAI allowed him to establish himself as a leader in the tribal community which started a shift for Indigenous perspectives to be represented in the federal government.

Importance of gaming in tribal development 
Gaming was a stimulate for many different tribes to begin generating unrestricted revenue, which jump started the revival of many Native communities. Unrestricted revenue is an important aspect to the economy of these tribes as this is revenue that is completely dedicated to the tribe members alone. This means that 100% of this type of income goes directly to the tribe and is not influenced by the federal government. Along with this unrestricted revenue, tribes began to develop self-sufficiency from the federal government, as most tribes (especially smaller ones) were heavily depending on the economic support of the US federal government. This new gaming economy allowed Natives to make their own money, which opened the door for the rebuilding of communities. Allen also used gaming to teach business skills and strategies to Native people on reservations. Allen reports that his main goal for Natives regarding gaming is to, "Continue to educate the general public about the resources and tools we provide for the betterment of our communities". These business strategies would allow Natives to continue making more money by establishing casinos, hotels, and golf courses which would offer both jobs, but also economic stability to the tribal government. This strategy was especially effective in states like California, where participating in gambling is illegal except on reservations. As gaming continued to grow in popularity in tribes, Allen began working with the National Indian Gaming Commission (NIGC) to approve new ordinances for his own tribe's gaming.

Current day involvement 
Allen is still working and serving today, leading his own tribes alongside others to continue developing economically and politically. In September 2022, Allen was awarded the "Tribal Self-Governance Vanguard Award” in recognition to his extended involvement helping tribes be economically independent. However, Allen is not done, still working on many different aspects of his tribe. Some of Allen's current projects include rebuilding salmon ecosystems, rebuilding governmental buildings in safe places (areas that are not affected by earthquakes or tsunamis), and continuing to diversity his tribe's economic portfolio. Allen's main goal is to be completely independent of the US government, stating that he wants his tribe to be unaffected if the US government suddenly collapsed.

References 

Wikipedia Student Program
Klallam people
Native American politicians
University of Washington alumni
21st-century Native American politicians
20th-century Native American politicians